Pandiarajan is an Indian actor, director who has played leading roles in many humorous Tamil films and currently plays supporting and comedy roles.

Personal life
Pandiarajan was born to Sulochana in Saidapet, Chennai in a lower-middle-class family. He has two sisters, Maheshwari & Geetha.

He has been married to Vasuki, daughter of Director, Producer, and Poet Avinasi Mani in 1986. They have three sons, Prithvi Rajan, Pallava Rajan and Prem Rajan.

Early career
Pandiarajan wanted to act in films. But due to his height and appearance he decided to join as an assistant director. He joined Thamizisai College where he had learnt violin and got his diploma as "Isai Selvam" in 1977. After that he had joined writer Thooyavan as an office assistant. Here he met director K. Bhagyaraj and later joined him as an assistant director. He had become his associate director in Darling, Darling, Darling and worked till the discussion of Mundhanai Mudichu. Pandiarajan told the story of the film Kanni Rasi to Sivaji Ganesan's brother Shanmugam, he listened to the story and accepted it, though financiers refused to buy, the film was successful at the box-office.

His first directorial venture was Kanni Rasi in 1985 starring Prabhu and Revathi. He directed and made his debut as a hero in Aan Paavam. Till now, he had directed nine films, including Kaivantha Kalai, Doubles where he directed Prabhu Deva in the lead role and acted in some 90 Tamil films and one Malayalam hit Kathavasheshan, where he acted with Dileep. Recently, he is acting in a TV serial called Mama Maaple in Sun TV. His English short film called Help has been nominated at the ArtDeco Film Festival 2011, at São Paulo, in Brazil. ‘Help' is Pandiarajan's first short film in English.

Filmography

Actor

1980s

1990s

2000s

2010s

2020s

As director

Television

Artists and Technicians introduced by Pandiarajan
 Srikanth Deva - Music Director
 Nithya - cameraman
 Mayilsamy - actor
 Kollangudi Karuppayee - Folk singer and actress
 Seetha- Actress
 Thotta Banu - Art Director
 Debashree Roy in Tamil - Actress

References

External links
 

Tamil male actors
Male actors in Tamil cinema
Male actors from Chennai
Living people
Tamil comedians
1959 births
Tamil film directors
Indian male comedians
Male actors in Malayalam cinema
20th-century Indian male actors
21st-century Indian male actors
Indian male film actors